Awateria watsoni is a species of sea snail, a marine gastropod mollusk in the family Borsoniidae.

Description
The length of the shell attains 6.5 mm, its breadth 3.3 mm.

(Original description) This small, white shell has a short fusiform shape. It has a large smooth apex. The upper slope of the six whorls is comparatively smooth, exhibiting only a few (about 4) faint spiral lirae, and the lower portion and the greater part of the body whorl are covered with a distinct cancellation, the points of intersection of the oblique and transverse lirae being rather acutely nodulose. The sinus is moderately deep. The arcuate lip is prominent.

Distribution
This  marine species is endemic to Australia.

References

watsoni
Gastropods described in 1891
Gastropods of Australia